Vincenzo Cavalli or Vincenzo Gaballi (25 March 1647 – June 1701) was a Roman Catholic prelate who served as Bishop of Bertinoro (1676–1701).

Biography
Vincenzo Cavalli was born in Ravenna, Italy on 25 March 1647. On 23 March 1676, he was appointed during the papacy of Pope Clement X as Bishop of Bertinoro. On 19 April 1676, he was consecrated bishop by Gasparo Carpegna, Cardinal-Priest of San Silvestro in Capite, with Prospero Bottini, Titular Archbishop of Myra, and Giacomo Buoni, Bishop of Montefeltro, serving as co-consecrators. He served as Bishop of Bertinoro until his death in June 1701.

References

External links and additional sources
 (for Chronology of Bishops)
 (for Chronology of Bishops)

17th-century Italian Roman Catholic bishops
18th-century Italian Roman Catholic bishops
Bishops appointed by Pope Clement X
1647 births
1701 deaths